Paul-André Guérin (26 September 1997) is a French professional footballer who plays as a goalkeeper for Championnat National 3 club Balagne.

Club career
Guerin played two years at the French Federation Academy of Corsica before moving to Ajaccio. He made his Ligue 1 debut on 2 December 2015 against Montpellier in a 2–0 away win replacing Jules Goda after 41 minutes.

In 2016, Guerin decided to travel to Fullerton, California to study at California State University, Fullerton while playing college football for The Titans. Guerin played 67 games for the senior first team,

In January 2020, Guerin returned to France and signed with Bastia-Borgo in Championnat National.

References

External links

1997 births
Footballers from Corsica
Living people
French footballers
Association football goalkeepers
AC Ajaccio players
Cal State Fullerton Titans men's soccer players
Gazélec Ajaccio players
FC Bastia-Borgo players
FC Balagne players
Ligue 1 players
Championnat National players
Championnat National 3 players
French expatriate footballers
French expatriate sportspeople in the United States
Expatriate soccer players in the United States